Tanah Datar Regency is a landlocked regency (kabupaten) in West Sumatra province, Indonesia. The regency has an area of 1,336 km2, and had a population of 338,484 at the 2010 Census, which rose to 371,704 at the 2020 Census. The regency seat is the town of Batusangkar. The city of Padang Panjang is also geographically located within the regency but constitutes a municipality (kota otonom) of its own.

Tanah Datar has several tourist attractions including the  Pagaruyung Palace (Istano Pagaruyuang) with its museum, Sanskrit and Malay language stone inscriptions from the 14th century, several sites with megaliths (batu tagak), and the village Pandai Sikat (Pandai Sikek), where the traditional songket (kain balapak) is still woven. The northern part of Lake Singkarak is situated in Tanah Datar. The traditional bull race pacu jawi take place in the regency too.

Administrative districts 
Tanah Datar is divided into fourteen districts (kecamatan), listed below with their areas and their populations at the 2010 Census and 2020 Census. The table also includes the locations of the district administrative centres, the number of administrative villages (rural desa and urban kelurahan) in each district, and its postal code.

Geography 
Geographically, Tanah Datar Regency is located in the middle of West Sumatra Province, at 00º17" South Latitude - 00º39" South Latitude and 100º19" East Longitude – 100º51" East Longitude. Average altitude 400 to 1000 meters above sea level.

Tanah Datar Regency is located between two mountains, namely Mount Marapi and Mount Singgalang. This topography is dominated by hilly areas, and has two-thirds of the Singkarak lake.

In general, the climate in Tanah Datar Regency is moderate with temperatures between 12 °C–25 °C with an average rainfall of more than 3,000 mm per year. Most of the rain falls from September to February. This high rainfall causes sufficient water availability, thus enabling extensive agricultural business to be developed.

Economies 
Tanah Datar Regency is an agricultural area, more than 70% of the population works in the agricultural sector, both food crop agriculture, plantations, fisheries, and animal husbandry. Likewise, community businesses in other sectors are also based on agriculture such as tourism and small industry or agro-industry. The people of Tanah Datar are also known to like to save with a total public savings of IDR 223 billion in 2004.

The economic potential of Tanah Datar Regency can be categorized into three categories, namely: Very Potential, Potential, and Not Potential. The agricultural sectors that have the potential to be developed are cassava, cabbage, rubber, sugar cane, beef cattle breeding, horse breeding, beef goat farming, broiler farming, non-breed chicken, duck farming, and freshwater fish farming. Other sectors that have great potential to be developed are the civil building construction industry, retail traders of processed food products, telecommunication stall businesses, souvenir traders, and historical tourism. Tanah Datar Regency has the potential of almost all agricultural sectors except cloves, tobacco, spinach, and pepper. While the mining sector that has the potential to be developed is the excavation of limestone and gravel.

Tourism 

In Tanah Datar Regency today, there are still many Minangkabau traditional historical relics, both in the form of objects and Minangkabau traditional cultural arrangements. The pledge Adat Basandi Syarak, Syarak Basandi Kitabullah also known as the Satie Oath came from Tanah Datar, namely in Bukit Marapalam, Puncak Pato, North Lintau Buo District.

Historical tourist attractions in Tanah Datar Regency include the Pagaruyung Palace (Istano Basa Pagaruyuang), Puncak Pato, Adityawarman Inscription (Prasasti Adityawarman),  (Batu Angkek-angkek),  (Rumah Gadang Balimbing), Waterwheel,  (Batu Basurek), Pariangan Old Village (Nagari Tuo Pariangan), Fort van der Capellen, Batikam Stone (Batu Batikam), and King Palace (Istano Rajo). Meanwhile, for natural and cultural tourism in Tanah Datar Regency, there are Anai Valley, Tabek Pateh Panorama, Pariangan Village, Singkarak Lake, Batu Patah Hill, and Ngalau Pangian.

References

External links 

  Official website

Regencies of West Sumatra